The 2003 Detroit Tigers season was the team's 103rd season. They finished with the most losses in American League history (119), and came within one loss of tying the 1962 New York Mets for the most losses in modern major league history. This would be the last year in which the team would lose 100 or more games in a season until 2019. 
The team went 43–119, which surpassed the 1916 Philadelphia Athletics for the most losses in American League history. But due to a shorter season in 1916, the Athletics had a worse winning percentage and seven fewer wins (36-117 record) than the 2003 Tigers.  The Tigers were outscored by 337 runs over the course of the season (928 to 591) and finished 47 games behind the Minnesota Twins. Blame for the dismal season was shared by both the pitching staff, which had an ERA of 5.30, and the batters, who finished with a team batting average of .240, 19 points below the American League's .259 batting average. On August 22, the Tigers were eliminated from playoff contention, the fastest playoff elimination until being surpassed by the 2018 Baltimore Orioles, who were eliminated on August 20 that same year.

Season overview

Reeling off yet another losing season in 2002, management found themselves in a big hole: a farm system that wasn't producing, a big-league club with major deficiencies, and contracts being paid to veterans not playing to expectations; those who did produce - Juan Acevedo, Randall Simon, and Robert Fick, did not return for 2003. Piloting the team was first-year manager and longtime Tiger favorite, Alan Trammell, who had a dilemma nearly everywhere on the roster, particularly the starting rotation. Gary Knotts, who had pitched mostly in relief in his career, was to be converted to a starting role; Detroit area native Steve Avery was looking to make a comeback after not pitching in two years; two untested rookies, Jeremy Bonderman - drafted straight out of high school - and Nate Robertson- acquired in a trade for Mark Redman to the Florida Marlins - also vied for their chances to make the big-league rotation.

The results were disastrous. The Tigers lost their first nine games, won their first against Chicago on April 12, then proceeded to drop eight in a row to fall to 1-17. An almost non-existent offense accounted for most of the team's early season woes, batting a paltry .228 as a team in the first half. To the surprise of many, their young corps of pitchers were performing better than expected and remained durable as the team struggled to score runs and the losses continued to pile up - 18 in May, 22 in June - with no reason to expect any change in fortune.

By the end of May, the Tigers were 14–39, 16.5 games out of first, and their season was all but finished. On August 30, after a 5–2 loss to the White Sox, the Tigers had lost 100 games for the second straight season; furthermore, they were gaining nationwide attention as they seemed a sure bet to break the infamous 1962 Mets' record for most losses in a season. Looking for a spark from the farm system, players were constantly being shuffled back and forth between Detroit and nearby Toledo, where the team's Triple-AAA affiliate Toledo Mud Hens played. Unfortunately, the Mud Hens were not well-stocked, either, compounding frustrations for a team already in complete disarray. Meanwhile, the pitching staff, which had remained remarkably intact through the first half, finally collapsed; Mike Maroth lost 21 games, the first MLB pitcher to lose 20 games in a season since Brian Kingman lost 20 for the 1980 Oakland Athletics, while Jeremy Bonderman lost 19 before Trammell mercifully pulled him from the rotation with two weeks remaining. Tigers' starters Maroth, Bonderman and Cornejo were the top three pitchers in losses for the 2003 season, the only time in Major League history that one team had the top three losers in a season.  Franklyn German had the most saves on the team, with five in limited opportunities.

On September 22, the Tigers had lost ten straight and 118 on the season. Just as they appeared likely to go into the record books for futility, the Tigers roared back to life and won five of their last six games to finish 43-119. While it was one game short of the 120 losses by the 1962 Mets, it was still the most losses in American League history and one of the worst seasons for a non-expansion team in modern baseball history. The final series of the season was particularly memorable against the division champion Minnesota Twins, 48 games ahead of Detroit. The Twins sat their starters for almost all of the series in order to keep players rested for the playoffs. On September 27, in their next-to-last game, the Tigers came back from an 8–0 deficit to beat the Twins, 9-8 - on a strikeout wild pitch, an appropriate finish to a team that had struggled mightily all summer long. The Tigers then won the season finale, 9–4, to avoid tying the record and received a standing ovation from the crowd.

While the 2003 Tigers finished with the third-most losses in major league history (behind the 1899 Cleveland Spiders and 1962 Mets), they fare slightly better based on winning percentage.

As of 2020, the 2003 Tigers rank only as the 12th worst team in history based on winning percentage (minimum 120 games), but unlike the 2003 Tigers, most of the other teams usually described as the worst of all time were plagued by significant off-field troubles:

 The 1899 Spiders (whose owners also owned the St. Louis Browns), the 1916 and 1919 A's (who had been plagued by financial problems) and the 1890 Alleghenys (who had almost all of their star players jump to the Players' League) had been reduced to minor league status.
 The 1886 Senators and Cowboys, 1889 Colonels, 1897-98 Browns, 1904 Senators and 1935 Braves were all plagued by financial and/or ownership issues, with the Colonels and Braves ownership failing to finish out the season.
 The 1962 Mets were a first-year expansion team.

For this reason, the 2003 Tigers have been described as being possibly "the worst team of all time without a good excuse."

Designated hitter/left fielder Dmitri Young was the one member of the 2003 Tigers to have a truly good year, with a .297 batting average, 29 home runs, and .537 slugging percentage. According to Win Shares, the Tigers would have had about six fewer wins without him.

On the pitching staff, Jamie Walker stands out as the one pitcher who had a good season. Walker appeared in 78 games (2nd most in the AL) and had an ERA of 3.32 (Adjusted ERA+ of 130).

Some blamed first-year manager Alan Trammell for the team's performance. However, the 2002 team was 55-106 under manager Luis Pujols and in short, Trammell inherited a team in shambles. The Tigers did not sign any significant new talent in 2003 and lost several key players from the 2002 team, including the team's best starter, Jeff Weaver, closer Juan Acevedo, second baseman Damion Easley, right fielder Robert Fick, and designated hitter Randall Simon.  Dean Palmer, who had 275 career home runs, tried to resuscitate an injury-plagued career, and could not succeed at that; his career came to an end. Even with fellow 1984 teammates Kirk Gibson and Lance Parrish on the coaching staff, Trammell could not turn the team around in 2003.

After the 2003 season, the Tigers acquired Iván Rodríguez, Carlos Guillén, Ugueth Urbina, and Rondell White. With the infusion of new talent, Trammell was able to lead the start of the franchise's turnaround, as the team improved to 72–90 in 2004, a 29-game improvement over the 2003 season which was the largest single-season improvement in the American League since Baltimore's 33-game improvement from 1988 to 1989.

Three years after losing 119 games, the Tigers went 95-67 and made it to the 2006 World Series. The 2006 pennant winners featured 10 players from the 2003 team: Brandon Inge, Ramón Santiago (who spent 2004 and 2005 with the Seattle Mariners), Craig Monroe, Omar Infante, Mike Maroth, Jeremy Bonderman, Nate Robertson, Jamie Walker, Wilfredo Ledezma, and Fernando Rodney. (Dmitri Young was released in September 2006 following off-field issues)

The record would not be threatened until 2018, when the Baltimore Orioles went 47-115. A year later, the Tigers themselves would also win just 47 games, but due to a cancelled game that reduced their season to 161 games, they only had 114 losses, meaning that Baltimore had the worst team of the entire 2010s decade.

The last remaining member from the 2003 squad still active was Fernando Rodney, who retired after the 2019 season, although he missed the 2004 season.

Season standings

Record vs. opponents

Roster

Transactions
November 25, 2002: Randall Simon was traded by the Detroit Tigers to the Pittsburgh Pirates for a player to be named later and Adrian Burnside (minors). The Pittsburgh Pirates sent Roberto Novoa (December 16, 2002) to the Detroit Tigers to complete the trade.
November 29, 2002: Ernie Young was signed as a free agent with the Detroit Tigers.
January 20, 2003: Bill Haselman was signed as a free agent with the Detroit Tigers.
January 23, 2003: Steve Avery was signed as a free agent with the Detroit Tigers.
March 27, 2003: Bill Haselman was released by the Detroit Tigers.
March 29, 2003: A. J. Hinch was purchased by the Detroit Tigers from the Cleveland Indians.

Game log

|- bgcolor="ffbbbb"
| 1 || March 31 || Twins || 1–3 || Radke (1–0) || Maroth (0–1) || Guardado (1) || 40,427 || 0–1 || L1
|-

|- bgcolor="ffbbbb"
| 2 || April 2 || Twins || 1–8 || Mays (1–0) || Bonderman (0–1) || — || 21,123 || 0–2 || L2
|- bgcolor="ffbbbb"
| 3 || April 3 || Twins || 0–3 || Lohse (1–0) || Bernero (0–1) || Guardado (2) || 8,862 || 0–3 || L3
|- bgcolor="ffbbbb"
| 4 || April 4 || @ White Sox || 2–5 || Loaiza (1–0) || Cornejo (0–1) || Koch (1) || 40,395 || 0–4 || L4
|- bgcolor="ffbbbb"
| 5 || April 5 || @ White Sox || 0–7 || Buehrle (1–1) || Maroth (0–2) || — || 16,972 || 0–5 || L5
|- bgcolor="ffbbbb"
| 6 || April 6 || @ White Sox || 2–10 || Marte (1–0) || German (0–1) || — || 14,514 || 0–6 || L6
|- bgcolor="ffbbbb"
| 7 || April 9 || Royals || 6–9 || Affeldt (1–0) || Bonderman (0–2) || MacDougal (4) || 14,286 || 0–7 || L7
|- bgcolor="ffbbbb"
| 8 || April 10 || Royals || 2–4 || Asencio (1–0) || Maroth (0–3) || MacDougal (5) || 9,080 || 0–8 || L8
|- bgcolor="ffbbbb"
| 9 || April 11 || White Sox || 0–5 || Loaiza (2–0) || Bernero (0–2) || — || 12,577 || 0–9 || L9
|- bgcolor="bbffbb"
| 10 || April 12 || White Sox || 4–3 || Cornejo (1–1) || Stewart (0–1) || Anderson (1) || 12,985 || 1–9 || W1
|- bgcolor="ffbbbb"
| 11 || April 13 || White Sox || 2–3 || Colon (1–0) || Knotts (0–1) || — || 12,808 || 1–10 || L1
|- bgcolor="ffbbbb"
| 12 || April 15 || @ Twins || 4–6 || Lohse (2–1) || Maroth (0–4) || Guardado (5) || 14,036 || 1–11 || L2
|- bgcolor="ffbbbb"
| 13 || April 16 || @ Twins || 2–4 || Reed (1–2) || Bernero (0–3) || Guardado (6) || 13,503 || 1–12 || L3
|- bgcolor="ffbbbb"
| 14 || April 17 || @ Twins || 0–6 || Rogers (2–0) || Bonderman (0–3) || — || 13,015 || 1–13 || L4
|- bgcolor="ffbbbb"
| 15 || April 18 || @ Royals || 3–4 || Carrasco (1–0) || Anderson (0–1) || — || 38,937 || 1–14 || L5
|- bgcolor="ffbbbb"
| 16 || April 19 || @ Royals || 2–9 || Lopez (3–0) || Knotts (0–2) || — || 13,777 || 1–15 || L6
|- bgcolor="ffbbbb"
| 17 || April 20 || @ Royals || 3–4 || MacDougal (1–0) || Maroth (0–5) || — || 16,203 || 1–16 || L7
|- bgcolor="ffbbbb"
| 18 || April 22 || @ Athletics || 5–6 || Rincon (1–1) || Ledezma (0–1) || — || 11,559 || 1–17 || L8
|- bgcolor="bbffbb"
| 19 || April 23 || @ Athletics || 4–1 || Bonderman (1–3) || Zito (3–2) || Anderson (2) || 23,558 || 2–17 || W1
|- bgcolor="ffbbbb"
| 20 || April 24 || @ Athletics || 0–2 || Mulder (3–1) || Cornejo (1–2) || — || 11,843 || 2–18 || L1
|- bgcolor="ffbbbb"
| 21 || April 25 || @ Mariners || 0–6 || Pineiro (2–1) || Maroth (0–6) || — || 33,458 || 2–19 || L2
|- bgcolor="bbffbb"
| 22 || April 26 || @ Mariners || 6–4 || Walker (1–0) || Franklin (1–2) || Anderson (3) || 36,258 || 3–19 || W1
|- bgcolor="ffbbbb"
| 23 || April 27 || @ Mariners || 3–4 || Garcia (2–3) || Bernero (0–4) || Nelson (2) || 39,678 || 3–20 || L1
|- bgcolor="ffbbbb"
| 24 || April 29 || Orioles || 3–11 || Johnson (4–0) || Bonderman (1–4) || — || 10,829 || 3–21 || L2
|-

|- bgcolor="ffbbbb"
| 25 || May 1 (1) || Orioles || 2–5 || Ryan (3–0) || German (0–2) || Julio (7) ||  || 3–22 || L3
|- bgcolor="ffbbbb"
| 26 || May 1 (2) || Orioles || 4–6 || Daal (2–3) || Maroth (0–7) || Julio (8) || 16,177 || 3–23 || L4
|- bgcolor="ffbbbb"
| 27 || May 2 || Devil Rays || 0–2 || Kennedy (2–2) || Knotts (0–3) || — || 14,571 || 3–24 || L5
|- bgcolor="ffbbbb"
| 28 || May 3 || Devil Rays || 6–8 || Levine (2–1) || Ledezma (0–2) || — || 13,371 || 3–25 || L6
|- bgcolor="bbffbb"
| 29 || May 4 || Devil Rays || 7–3 || Bonderman (2–4) || Sosa (1–4) || Spurling (1) || 12,956 || 4–25 || W1
|- bgcolor="bbffbb"
| 30 || May 5 || @ Orioles || 6–1 || Cornejo (2–2) || Johnson (4–1) || Sparks (1) || 17,267 || 5–25 || W2
|- bgcolor="bbffbb" 
| 31 || May 6 || @ Orioles || 7–6 || German (1–2) || Groom (1–1) || — || 22,906 || 6–25 || W3
|- bgcolor="bbffbb"
| 32 || May 7 || @ Orioles || 9–4 || Knotts (1–3) || Daal (2–4) || — || 22,770 || 7–25 || W4
|- bgcolor="ffbbbb"
| 33 || May 9 || @ Devil Rays || 0–2 || Parque (1–1) || Bernero (0–5) || Carter (6) || 8,894 || 7–26 || L1
|- bgcolor="ffbbbb"
| 34 || May 10 || @ Devil Rays || 1–3 || McClung (3–1) || Bonderman (2–5) || Carter (7) || 12,325 || 7–27 || L2
|- bgcolor="bbffbb"
| 35 || May 11 || @ Devil Rays || 9–2 || Cornejo (3–2) || Sosa (1–5) || — || 9,259 || 8–27 || W1
|- bgcolor="ffbbbb"
| 36 || May 13 || Athletics || 1–3 || Lilly (3–2) || Maroth (0–8) || Foulke (11) || 12,563 || 8–28 || L1
|- bgcolor="bbffbb"
| 37 || May 14 || Athletics || 2–1 || Avery (1–0) || Rincon (2–2) || — || 11,091 || 9–28 || W1
|- bgcolor="ffbbbb"
| 38 || May 15 || Athletics || 2–11 || Zito (6–3) || Bernero (0–6) || — || 10,513 || 9–29 || L1
|- bgcolor="ffbbbb"
| 39 || May 16 || Mariners || 3–6 || Meche (5–2) || Bonderman (2–6) || Sasaki (5) || 17,641 || 9–30 || L2
|- bgcolor="ffbbbb"
| 40 || May 17 || Mariners || 3–6 || Moyer (6–2) || Cornejo (3–3) || Sasaki (6) || 23,274 || 9–31 || L3
|- bgcolor="ffbbbb"
| 41 || May 18 || Mariners || 2–6 || Pineiro (4–3) || Maroth (0–9) || — || 16,263 || 9–32 || L4
|- bgcolor="ffbbbb"
| 42 || May 19 || @ Indians || 9–10 || Traber (2–2) || Walker (1–1) || Riske (1) || 16,492 || 9–33 || L5
|- bgcolor="ffbbbb"
| 43 || May 20 || @ Indians || 4–6 || Riske (1–0) || Roney (0–1) || — || 15,499 || 9–34 || L6
|- bgcolor="ffbbbb"
| 44 || May 21 || @ Indians || 0–4 || Sabathia (3–2) || Bonderman (2–7) || — || 16,534 || 9–35 || L7
|- bgcolor="bbffbb"
| 45 || May 22 || @ Indians || 3–2 || German (2–2) || Phillips (0–1) || Sparks (2) || 18,347 || 10–35 || W1
|- bgcolor="bbffbb"
| 46 || May 23 || @ White Sox || 3–2 || Maroth (1–9) || Gordon (2–4) || Spurling (2) || 15,069 || 11–35 || W2
|- bgcolor="bbffbb"
| 47 || May 24 || @ White Sox || 1–0 || Knotts (2–3) || Loaiza (7–2) || German (1) || 27,535 || 12–35 || W3
|- bgcolor="ffbbbb"
| 48 || May 25 || @ White Sox || 5–8 || Glover (1–0) || Sparks (0–1) || — || 21,398 || 12–36 || L1
|- bgcolor="bbffbb"
| 49 || May 26 || Indians || 6–5 || Avery (2–0) || Boyd (0–1) || German (2) || 17,619 || 13–36 || W1
|- bgcolor="ffbbbb"
| 50 || May 27 || Indians || 2–5 || Miceli (1–2) || Walker (1–2) || Baez (10) || 10,844 || 13–37 || L1
|- bgcolor="ffbbbb"
| 51 || May 28 || Indians || 2–8 || Rodriguez (3–5) || Maroth (1–10) || — || 17,388 || 13–38 || L2
|- bgcolor="ffbbbb"
| 52 || May 30 || Yankees || 0–6 || Contreras (2–1) || Knotts (2–4) || — || 28,003 || 13–39 || L3
|- bgcolor="bbffbb"
| 53 || May 31 || Yankees || 4–2 || Bernero (1–6) || Weaver (3–4) || German (3) || 24,959 || 14–39 || W1
|-

|- bgcolor="ffbbbb"
| 54 || June 1 || Yankees || 9–10 || Wells (7–2) || Sparks (0–2) || Acevedo (6) || 44,095 || 14–40 || L1
|- bgcolor="bbffbb"
| 55 || June 3 || @ Padres || 3–2 || Walker (2–2) || Lawrence (3–7) || German (4) || 15,521 || 15–40 || W1
|- bgcolor="bbffbb"
| 56 || June 4 || @ Padres || 5–3 || Ledezma (1–2) || Hackman (1–1) || German (5) || 13,227 || 16–40 || W2
|- bgcolor="ffbbbb"
| 57 || June 5 || @ Padres || 1–5 || Eaton (2–4) || Bernero (1–7) || — || 14,710 || 16–41 || L1
|- bgcolor="ffbbbb"
| 58 || June 6 || @ Giants || 3–5 || Rueter (7–1) || Bonderman (2–8) || Worrell (15) || 41,554 || 16–42 || L2
|- bgcolor="ffbbbb"
| 59 || June 7 || @ Giants || 5–7 || Schmidt (5–2) || Maroth (1–11) || — || 40,060 || 16–43 || L3
|- bgcolor="ffbbbb"
| 60 || June 8 || @ Giants || 6–7 || Nathan (6–2) || German (2–3) || Worrell (16) || 41,177 || 16–44 || L4
|- bgcolor="ffbbbb"
| 61 || June 10 || Dodgers || 1–3 || Shuey (3–1) || Sparks (0–3) || Gagne (22) || 13,419 || 16–45 || L5
|- bgcolor="ffbbbb"
| 62 || June 11 || Dodgers || 1–3 || Brown (9–1) || Bernero (1–8) || Gagne (23) || 13,716 || 16–46 || L6
|- bgcolor="ffbbbb"
| 63 || June 12 || Dodgers || 2–3 || Ishii (6–2) || Bonderman (2–9) || Gagne (24) || 13,644 || 16–47 || L7
|- bgcolor="ffbbbb"
| 64 || June 13 || Rockies || 2–7 || Chacon (9–3) || Cornejo (3–4) || — || 19,212 || 16–48 || L8
|- bgcolor="bbffbb"
| 65 || June 14 || Rockies || 9–7 || Ledezma (2–2) || Elarton (3–2) || Spurling (3) || 19,260 || 17–48 || W1
|- bgcolor="ffbbbb"
| 66 || June 15 || Rockies || 4–5 || Jennings (6–5) || Knotts (2–5) || Jimenez (16) || 19,323 || 17–49 || L1
|- bgcolor="ffbbbb"
| 67 || June 17 || Indians || 4–7 || Sabathia (6–3) || Bernero (1–9) || Baez (15) || 13,908 || 17–50 || L2
|- bgcolor="ffbbbb"
| 68 || June 18 || Indians || 1–4 || Davis (6–5) || Bonderman (2–10) || — || 16,278 || 17–51 || L3
|- bgcolor="ffbbbb"
| 69 || June 19 || Indians || 3–10 || Anderson (4–6) || Cornejo (3–5) || — || 19,098 || 17–52 || L4
|- bgcolor="bbffbb"
| 70 || June 20 || @ Rockies || 7–5 || Maroth (2–11) || Elarton (3–3) || — || 29,603 || 18–52 || W1
|- bgcolor="ffbbbb"
| 71 || June 21 || @ Rockies || 6–9 || Jennings (7–5) || Sparks (0–4) || — || 35,660 || 18–53 || L1
|- bgcolor="ffbbbb"
| 72 || June 22 || @ Rockies || 3–5 || Neagle (1–1) || Bernero (1–10) || Jimenez (17) || 34,723 || 18–54 || L2
|- bgcolor="ffbbbb"
| 73 || June 23 || @ Red Sox || 1–3 || Wakefield (6–3) || Bonderman (2–11) || Timlin (2) || 33,814 || 18–55 || L3
|- bgcolor="ffbbbb"
| 74 || June 24 || @ Red Sox || 1–10 || Lowe (8–3) || Cornejo (3–6) || — || 33,848 || 18–56 || L4
|- bgcolor="ffbbbb"
| 75 || June 25 || @ Red Sox || 2–11 || Burkett (6–3) || Maroth (2–12) || — || 33,587 || 18–57 || L5
|- bgcolor="ffbbbb"
| 76 || June 26 || @ Red Sox || 4–6 || Martinez (5–2) || Roney (0–2) || Lyon (9) || 34,415 || 18–58 || L6
|- bgcolor="ffbbbb"
| 77 || June 27 || D-backs || 3–8 || Randolph (2–0) || Bernero (1–11) || — || 27,682 || 18–59 || L7
|- bgcolor="ffbbbb"
| 78 || June 28 || D-backs || 0–7 || Webb (4–2) || Bonderman (2–12) || — || 20,804 || 18–60 || L8
|- bgcolor="ffbbbb"
| 79 || June 29 || D-backs || 3–5 || Oropesa (2–1) || Spurling (0–1) || Valverde (9) || 18,989 || 18–61 || L9
|- bgcolor="bbffbb"
| 80 || June 30 || Blue Jays || 6–2 || Maroth (3–12) || Lidle (10–6) || — || 13,353 || 19–61 || W1
|-

|- bgcolor="bbffbb"
| 81 || July 1 || Blue Jays || 5–0 || Roney (1–2) || Hendrickson (5–6) || Walker (1) || 15,448 || 20–61 || W2
|- bgcolor="ffbbbb"
| 82 || July 2 || Blue Jays || 2–8 || Halladay (12–2) || Bernero (1–12) || — || 16,052 || 20–62 || L1
|- bgcolor="ffbbbb"
| 83 || July 3 || @ Royals || 2–3 || Affeldt (5–4) || Bonderman (2–13) || MacDougal (22) || 12,978 || 20–63 || L2
|- bgcolor="ffbbbb"
| 84 || July 4 || @ Royals || 8–9 || Field (1–0) || Cornejo (3–7) || MacDougal (23) || 39,920 || 20–64 || L3
|- bgcolor="bbffbb"
| 85 || July 5 || @ Royals || 9–5 || Maroth (4–12) || Voyles (0–2) || Walker (2) || 19,030 || 21–64 || W1
|- bgcolor="ffbbbb"
| 86 || July 6 || @ Royals || 3–5 || Lima (4–0) || Roney (1–3) || MacDougal (24) || 12,844 || 21–65 || L1
|- bgcolor="bbffbb"
| 87 || July 8 || White Sox || 2–1 || Spurling (1–1) || Garland (6–7) || Mears (1) || 13,643 || 22–65 || W1
|- bgcolor="bbffbb"
| 88 || July 9 || White Sox || 4–2 || Bonderman (3–13) || Colon (6–8) || Mears (2) || 12,869 || 23–65 || W2
|- bgcolor="bbffbb"
| 89 || July 10 || White Sox || 1–0 || Cornejo (4–7) || Loaiza (11–5) || Mears (3) || 18,206 || 24–65 || W3
|- bgcolor="ffbbbb"
| 90 || July 11 || Red Sox || 3–5 || Burkett (7–4) || Maroth (4–13) || Kim (4) || 26,538 || 24–66 || L1
|- bgcolor="ffbbbb"
| 91 || July 12 || Red Sox || 2–4 || Jones (3–4) || Rodney (0–1) || Kim (5) || 23,206 || 24–67 || L2
|- bgcolor="bbffbb"
| 92 || July 13 || Red Sox || 3–0 || Ledezma (3–2) || Wakefield (6–4) || Mears (4) || 23,829 || 25–67 || W1
|- bgcolor="bbffbb"
| 93 || July 17 || @ White Sox || 10–9 || Maroth (5–13) || Colon (6–9) || — || 17,060 || 26–67 || W2
|- bgcolor="ffbbbb"
| 94 || July 18 || @ White Sox || 5–7 || Buehrle (8–10) || Roney (1–4) || Gordon (4) || 18,868 || 26–68 || L1
|- bgcolor="ffbbbb"
| 95 || July 19 || @ White Sox || 2–6 || Garland (7–7) || Cornejo (4–8) || Marte (5) || 32,245 || 26–69 || L2
|- bgcolor="ffbbbb"
| 96 || July 20 || @ White Sox || 1–10 || Loaiza (12–5) || Ledezma (3–3) || — || 20,631 || 26–70 || L3
|- bgcolor="ffbbbb"
| 97 || July 21 || @ Red Sox || 5–14 || Burkett (8–4) || Bonderman (3–14) || Fossum (1) || 33,823 || 26–71 || L4
|- bgcolor="ffbbbb"
| 98 || July 22 || @ Red Sox || 4–7 || Lowe (11–4) || Maroth (5–14) || — || 33,570 || 26–72 || L5
|- bgcolor="ffbbbb"
| 99 || July 23 || @ Indians || 1–4 || Anderson (8–7) || Roney (1–5) || Baez (22) || 21,202 || 26–73 || L6
|- bgcolor="bbffbb"
| 100 || July 24 || @ Indians || 7–4 || Cornejo (5–8) || Sabathia (8–6) || Mears (5) || 20,857 || 27–73 || W1
|- bgcolor="ffbbbb"
| 101 || July 25 || Royals || 3–8 || Hernandez (5–3) || Ledezma (3–4) || — || 29,697 || 27–74 || L1
|- bgcolor="bbffbb"
| 102 || July 26 || Royals || 5–1 || Bonderman (4–14) || Snyder (1–5) || — || 24,664 || 28–74 || W1
|- bgcolor="ffbbbb"
| 103 || July 27 || Royals || 1–5 || Lima (7–0) || Maroth (5–15) || — || 35,326 || 28–75 || L1
|- bgcolor="ffbbbb"
| 104 || July 29 || @ Mariners || 5–11 || Meche (11–7) || Roney (1–6) || — || 30,732 || 28–76 || L2
|- bgcolor="ffbbbb"
| 105 || July 30 || @ Mariners || 3–13 || Moyer (14–5) || Cornejo (5–9) || — || 35,800 || 28–77 || L3
|- bgcolor="ffbbbb"
| 106 || July 31 || @ Mariners || 0–4 || Pineiro (13–5) || Ledezma (3–5) || — || 43,596 || 28–78 || L4
|-

|- bgcolor="ffbbbb"
| 107 || August 1 || @ Twins || 4–10 || Lohse (7–9) || Bonderman (4–15) || Baldwin (1) || 20,101 || 28–79 || L5
|- bgcolor="bbffbb"
| 108 || August 2 || @ Twins || 9–2 || Maroth (6–15) || Reed (5–10) || — || 29,278 || 29–79 || W1
|- bgcolor="ffbbbb"
| 109 || August 3 || @ Twins || 2–7 || Santana (5–3) || Roney (1–7) || — || 27,613 || 29–80 || L1
|- bgcolor="ffbbbb"
| 110 || August 5 || Athletics || 2–7 || Harden (3–0) || Cornejo (5–10) || — || 13,263 || 29–81 || L2
|- bgcolor="ffbbbb"
| 111 || August 6 || Athletics || 3–9 || Hudson (10–4) || Ledezma (3–6) || — || 16,545 || 29–82 || L3
|- bgcolor="bbffbb"
| 112 || August 7 || Athletics || 3–2 || Bonderman (5–15) || Zito (8–10) || Patterson (1) || 19,664 || 30–82 || W1
|- bgcolor="ffbbbb"
| 113 || August 8 || Twins || 3–4 || Santana (6–3) || Maroth (6–16) || Guardado (26) || 23,740 || 30–83 || L1
|- bgcolor="ffbbbb"
| 114 || August 9 || Twins || 4–8 || Rincón (3–4) || Mears (0–1) || — || 19,199 || 30–84 || L2
|- bgcolor="ffbbbb"
| 115 || August 10 || Twins || 3–4 || Rogers (9–6) || Cornejo (5–11) || Guardado (27) || 19,975 || 30–85 || L3
|- bgcolor="ffbbbb"
| 116 || August 11 || @ Rangers || 3–9 || Benoit (7–5) || Sparks (0–5) || — || 27,674 || 30–86 || L4
|- bgcolor="bbffbb"
| 117 || August 12 || @ Rangers || 7–4 || Bonderman (6–15) || Dominguez (0–1) || Patterson (2) || 17,524 || 31–86 || W1
|- bgcolor="ffbbbb"
| 118 || August 13 || @ Rangers || 3–7 || Dickey (7–5) || Maroth (6–17) || Cordero (9) || 17,491 || 31–87 || L1
|- bgcolor="ffbbbb"
| 119 || August 14 || @ Rangers || 3–6 || Thomson (10–10) || Roney (1–8) || Cordero (10) || 17,019 || 31–88 || L2
|- bgcolor="ffbbbb"
| 120 || August 15 || @ Angels || 1–3 || Lackey (8–11) || Cornejo (5–12) || Percival (26) || 43,174 || 31–89 || L3
|- bgcolor="ffbbbb"
| 121 || August 16 || @ Angels || 7–11 || Glover (2–0) || Ledezma (3–7) || — || 42,337 || 31–90 || L4
|- bgcolor="ffbbbb"
| 122 || August 17 || @ Angels || 6–11 || Ortiz (14–10) || Bonderman (6–16) || — || 40,745 || 31–91 || L5
|- bgcolor="ffbbbb"
| 123 || August 18 || Rangers || 2–4 || Mahay (2–0) || Sparks (0–6) || Dickey (1) || 11,698 || 31–92 || L6
|- bgcolor="ffbbbb"
| 124 || August 19 || Rangers || 4–5 || Thomson (11–10) || Maroth (6–18) || Shouse (1) || 13,501 || 31–93 || L7
|- bgcolor="ffbbbb"
| 125 || August 20 || Rangers || 0–6 || Dickey (8–5) || Cornejo (5–13) || — || 13,788 || 31–94 || L8 
|- bgcolor="ffbbbb"
| 126 || August 21 || Angels || 7–10 || Sele (7–9) || Roney (1–9) || — || 12,236 || 31–95 || L9
|- bgcolor="ffbbbb"
| 127 || August 22 || Angels || 5–6 || Ortiz (15–10) || Bonderman (6–17) || Percival (27) || 21,955 || 31–96 || L10
|- bgcolor="ffbbbb"
| 128 || August 23 || Angels || 8–14 || Donnelly (2–2) || Spurling (1–2) || — || 26,463 || 31–97 || L11
|- bgcolor="bbffbb"
| 129 || August 24 || Angels || 10–9 || Walker (3–2) || Percival (0–4) || — || 17,382 || 32–97 || W1
|- bgcolor="bbffbb"
| 130 || August 26 || @ Indians || 5–4 || Cornejo (6–13) || Traber (6–7) || Walker (3) || 16,972 || 33–97 || W2
|- bgcolor="ffbbbb"
| 131 || August 27 || @ Indians || 7–9 || Cressend (2–0) || Spurling (1–3) || Riske (4) || 16,457 || 33–98 || L1
|- bgcolor="ffbbbb"
| 132 || August 28 || @ Indians || 3–8 || Lee (3–1) || Bonderman (6–18) || — || 16,282 || 33–99 || L2
|- bgcolor="bbffbb"
| 133 || August 29 || White Sox || 8–4 || Robertson (1–0) || Buehrle (11–13) || — || 15,828 || 34–99 || W1
|- bgcolor="ffbbbb"
| 134 || August 30 || White Sox || 2–5 || Garland (10–10) || Maroth (6–19) || — || 15,786 || 34–100 || L1
|- bgcolor="ffbbbb"
| 135 || August 31 || White Sox || 1–6 || Loaiza (18–6) || Cornejo (6–14) || — || 15,873 || 34–101 || L2
|-

|- bgcolor="ffbbbb"
| 136 || September 1 || Indians || 4–7 || Santiago (1–1) || Walker (3–3) || Riske (5) || 10,986 || 34–102 || L3  
|- bgcolor="bbffbb"
| 137 || September 2 || Indians || 8–6 || Schmack (1–0) || Durbin (0–1) || Rodney (1) || 9,318 || 35–102 || W1
|- bgcolor="bbffbb"
| 138 || September 3 || Indians || 6–5 || Walker (4–3) || Santiago (1–2) || — || 10,234 || 36–102 || W2
|- bgcolor="bbffbb"
| 139 || September 4 || Indians || 2–1 || Knotts (3–5) || Westbrook (6–9) || Patterson (3) || 11,371 || 37–102 || W3
|- bgcolor="ffbbbb"
| 140 || September 5 || @ Blue Jays || 6–8 || Sturtze (7–6) || Maroth (6–20) || Lopez (9) || 14,455 || 37–103 || L1
|- bgcolor="ffbbbb"
| 141 || September 6 || @ Blue Jays || 0–1 || Halladay (19–6) || Rodney (0–2) || — || 18,261 || 37–104 || L2
|- bgcolor="ffbbbb"
| 142 || September 7 || @ Blue Jays || 0–8 || Towers (5–1) || Mears (0–2) || — || 16,617 || 37–105 || L3
|- bgcolor="ffbbbb"
| 143 || September 9 || @ Yankees || 2–4 || White (4–0) || Rodney (0–3) || Rivera (34) || 31,826 || 37–106 || L4
|- bgcolor="ffbbbb"
| 144 || September 10 || @ Yankees || 5–15 || Pettitte (18–8) || Knotts (3–6) || — || 34,000 || 37–107 || L5
|- bgcolor="ffbbbb"
| 145 || September 11 || @ Yankees || 2–5 || Clemens (14–9) || Cornejo (6–15) || Rivera (35) || 31,915 || 37–108 || L6
|- bgcolor="bbffbb"
| 146 || September 12 || Royals || 3–0 || Maroth (7–20) || Abbott (1–1) || Rodney (2) || 18,042 || 38–108 || W1
|- bgcolor="ffbbbb"
| 147 || September 13 || Royals || 0–7 || Wright (1–1) || Mears (0–3) || — || 15,966 || 38–109 || L1
|- bgcolor="ffbbbb"
| 148 || September 14 || Royals || 2–7 || Gobble (4–4) || Robertson (0–2) || — || 13,579 || 38–110 || L2
|- bgcolor="ffbbbb"
| 149 || September 15 || Royals || 4–10 || Anderson (12–11) || Knotts (3–7) || — || 9,342 || 38–111 || L3
|- bgcolor="ffbbbb"
| 150 || September 16 || Blue Jays || 6–9 || Kershner (2–3) || Cornejo (6–16) || — || 9,801 || 38–112 || L4
|- bgcolor="ffbbbb"
| 151 || September 17 || Blue Jays || 0–6 || Halladay (21–6) || Loux (0–1) || — || 11,240 || 38–113 || L5
|- bgcolor="ffbbbb"
| 152 || September 18 || Blue Jays || 6–10 || Towers (7–1) || Maroth (7–21) || — || 9,951 || 38–114 || L6
|- bgcolor="ffbbbb"
| 153 || September 19 || @ Twins || 2–6 || Milton (1–0) || Bonderman (6–19) || — || 30,013 || 38–115 || L7
|- bgcolor="ffbbbb"
| 154 || September 20 || @ Twins || 3–7 || Santana (12–3) || Robertson (1–2) || — || 26,903 || 38–116 || L8
|- bgcolor="ffbbbb"
| 155 || September 21 || @ Twins || 4–6 || Radke (14–10) || Cornejo (6–17) || Guardado (39) || 33,396 || 38–117 || L9
|- bgcolor="ffbbbb"
| 156 || September 22 || @ Royals || 6–12 || Affeldt (7–6) || Knotts (3–8) || — || 10,574 || 38–118 || L10
|- bgcolor="bbffbb"
| 157 || September 23 || @ Royals || 15–6 || Maroth (8–21) || Lima (8–2) || — || 11,180 || 39–118 || W1
|- bgcolor="bbffbb"
| 158 || September 24 || @ Royals || 4–3 || Loux (1–1) || Gobble (4–5) || Rodney (3) || 10,758 || 40–118 || W2
|- bgcolor="bbffbb"
| 159 || September 25 || Twins || 5–4 || Mears (1–3) || Thomas (0–1) || — || 9,296 || 41–118 || W3
|- bgcolor="ffbbbb"
| 160 || September 26 || Twins || 4–5 || Guardado (3–5) || German (2–4) || Hawkins (2) || 16,518 || 41–119 || L1
|- bgcolor="bbffbb"
| 161 || September 27 || Twins || 9–8 || Rodney (1–3) || Orosco (2–2) || — || 14,277 || 42–119 || W1
|- bgcolor="bbffbb"
| 162 || September 28 || Twins || 9–4 || Maroth (9–21) || Johnson (0–1) || — || 18,959 || 43–119 || W2
|-

Detailed Records

Player stats

Batting

Note: G = Games played; AB = At bats; H = Hits; Avg. = Batting average; HR = Home runs; RBI = Runs batted in

Note: pitchers' batting statistics not included

Starting and other pitchers
Note: G = Games pitched; IP = Innings pitched; W = Wins; L = Losses; ERA = Earned run average; SO = Strikeouts

Relief pitchers
Note: G = Games pitched; W= Wins; L= Losses; SV = Saves; GF= Games finished; ERA = Earned run average; SO = Strikeouts

League Leaders and Awards
 Jeremy Bonderman: #2 in MLB  in losses (19)
 Jeremy Bonderman: #2 in AL in wild pitches (12)
 Jeremy Bonderman: second youngest player in AL (20)
 Nate Cornejo: #5 in AL in hits allowed (236)
 Nate Cornejo: #3 in MLB in losses (17)
 Brandon Inge: AL leader in baserunners caught stealing (40)
 Brandon Inge: AL leader in double plays by a catcher (11)
 Mike Maroth: AL leader in home runs allowed (34)
 Mike Maroth: MLB leader in losses (21)
 Mike Maroth: MLB leader in earned runs allowed (123)
 Mike Maroth: AL leader in baserunners caught stealing (11)
 Mike Maroth: AL leader in baserunners picked off (7)
 Carlos Peña: AL leader in errors by a first baseman (13)
 Alex Sánchez: #2 in AL in stolen bases (44)
 Alex Sánchez: MLB leader in times caught stealing (18)
 Ramón Santiago: MLB leader in sacrifice hits (18)
 Jamie Walker: #2 in AL in games by a pitcher (78)
 Dmitri Young: Tiger of the Year Award
 Dmitri Young: #5 in AL in strikeouts (130)
 Dmitri Young: #4 in AL in intentional walks (16)

Farm system

See also

List of worst Major League Baseball season records

Notes
a.Ryan was credited with the win without throwing a pitch. With two outs in the bottom of the 7th, he picked off Omar Infante at first to end the inning. The Orioles then took the lead in the top of the eighth, meaning Ryan would be in line for a win. Ryan was replaced with Buddy Groom before the bottom of the eighth. Baltimore kept the lead and Ryan was recorded with the win.

References

External links
 Baseball-Reference.com 2003 Tigers

Detroit Tigers seasons
Detroit Tigers Season, 2003
Detroit Tigers
2003 in Detroit